A siren song typically refers to the song of the siren, dangerous creatures in Greek mythology who lured sailors with their music and voices to shipwreck.

(The) Siren Song or (The) Siren's Song may also refer to:

Films and literature 
The Siren's Song (1919 film), a lost 1919 film starring Theda Bara
 The Siren Song, the second book in the Pirates of the Caribbean: Jack Sparrow series

Music

Albums 
Siren's Song (album), a 2011 album by The Union
Song of the Sirens, a 2020 album by GFRIEND

Songs 
 "Siren Song" (Erasure song), 1991
 "Siren Song" (Maruv song), 2019
"The Siren's Song", a song by metalcore band Oh, Sleeper from their debut album When I Am God
"The Siren's Song", a song by metalcore band Parkway Drive from their second album Horizons
"Siren Song", a song by metalcore band The Ghost Inside from their debut album Fury and the Fallen Ones
"Siren Song", a song by Jerry Cantrell from his 2021 album Brighten
"Sirens Song", a song by metalcore band Miss May I from their third album At Heart

Television 

Siren's Song (Charmed), a 2002 episode of Charmed
"The Siren's Song", a 2011 episode of Scooby-Doo! Mystery Incorporated

See also 
 Siren (disambiguation)
 Siren Song of the Counter Culture, 2004 album by Rise Against
 The Siren Song of Stephen Jay Gould, a one-act play by Benjamin Bettenbender